Ecclesia Gnostica Catholica (E.G.C.), or the Gnostic Catholic Church, is a Gnostic church organization. It is the ecclesiastical arm of the Ordo Templi Orientis (O.T.O.), an international fraternal initiatory organization devoted to promulgating the Law of Thelema.

Thelema is a philosophical, mystical and religious system elaborated by Aleister Crowley, and based on The Book of the Law. The word Catholic denotes the universality of doctrine and not a Christian or Roman Catholic belief set.

The chief function of Ecclesia Gnostica Catholica is the public and private performance of the Gnostic Mass (Liber XV), a eucharistic ritual written by Crowley in 1913. According to William Bernard Crow, Crowley wrote the Gnostic Mass "under the influence of the Liturgy of St. Basil of the Russian Church". Its structure is also influenced by the initiatory rituals of the Ordo Templi Orientis. Its most notable separation from similar rites of other churches is a Priestess officiating with a Priest, Deacon, and two Children. In addition to the Eucharist, baptism, confirmation, marriage, and last rites are offered by E.G.C. Marriage is not limited to couples of different genders.

About the Gnostic Mass, Crowley wrote in The Confessions of Aleister Crowley, "... the Ritual of the Gnostic Catholic Church ... I prepared for the use of the O.T.O., the central ceremony of its public and private celebration, corresponding to the Mass of the Roman Catholic Church." It is the single most commonly performed ritual at O.T.O. bodies, with many locations celebrating the Mass monthly or more frequently. Most O.T.O. bodies make some or all of these celebrations open to interested members of the public, so the Mass is often an individual's first experience of the O.T.O.

Ecclesia Gnostica Catholica has a hierarchical structure of clergy, assisting officers, and laity which parallels the degree structure of the O.T.O. initiatory system. Before 1997, the two systems were more loosely correlated, but since then there have been strict rules concerning minimum O.T.O. degrees required to serve in particular E.G.C. roles.

Membership

Membership in Ecclesia Gnostica Catholica is similar to the Roman Catholic Church, with some important differences. As currently constituted, E.G.C. includes both clergy and laity. Clergy must be initiate members of O.T.O., while laity may affiliate to E.G.C. through baptism and confirmation without undertaking any of the degree initiations of the Order.

Novice clergy are initiate members who participate in the administration of E.G.C. sacraments, although they have not yet taken orders (i.e., been through a ceremony of ordination).

The first ordination in E.G.C. is that of the diaconate. Second Degree initiates of O.T.O. who have been confirmed in E.G.C. can be ordained as Deacons, whose principal duties are to assist the Priesthood.

The sacerdotal ordination admits members to the priesthood. Sacerdotal ordinands must hold at least the K.E.W. degree of O.T.O., a degree only available by invitation. The Priesthood is responsible for administering the sacraments through the Gnostic Mass and other ceremonies as authorized by their supervising Bishops.

The Priesthood is supervised and instructed by the Episcopate, or Bishops. Full initiation to the Seventh Degree of O.T.O. includes episcopal consecration in E.G.C. The Tenth Degree Supreme and Holy King serves as the Primate or chief Bishop for any country that O.T.O. has organized a Grand Lodge. The Frater (or Soror) Superior of O.T.O. is also the Patriarch (Matriarch) of the Church, with ultimate authority over the clergy.

Rituals
The principal ritual of Ecclesia Gnostica Catholica is the Gnostic Mass, a Eucharistic ceremony written by Aleister Crowley in 1913. Theodor Reuss produced and authorized a German translation in 1918.

The text of the Gnostic Mass makes reference to ceremonies of baptism, confirmation, and marriage. Crowley left some notes towards a baptism ritual, and his "Liber CVI" was written for use in a last rites circumstance. The Bishops of the contemporary Church have developed rituals for all of these purposes, as well as infant benedictions, consecration of holy oil, funerals, and home administration of the Eucharist to the sick.

Although some Gnostic Masses are held privately for initiates only, there is nothing 'secret' about E.G.C. rituals as such, and they are commonly open to the public.

Saints of Ecclesia Gnostica Catholica
The Gnostic Saints of Ecclesia Gnostica Catholica are a series of historical and mythological figures revered in the religion of Thelema. They are found in the fifth Collect of Liber XV, titled "The Saints".

Two Gnostic Saints have been officially added to the original list. William Blake was so recognized based on a discovered writing by Aleister Crowley which described him as such. Giordano Bruno was more recently added to the list.

History
The Ecclesia Gnostica Catholica descended from a line of French Gnostic revival churches that developed in the 19th century. At that time, these Gnostic churches were essentially Christian in nature. In 1907, Gerard Encausse, Jean Bricaud and Louis-Sophrone Fugairon founded their own, simply called the Gnostic Catholic Church. In 1908, they gave O.T.O. Grand Master Theodor Reuss episcopal consecration and primatial authority in their GCC. Later that year, Reuss incorporated the Gnostic Catholic Church into O.T.O. after the original founders renamed their own church to the Universal Gnostic Church.

The name "Ecclesia Gnostica Catholica" was not applied to the church until Crowley wrote the Gnostic Mass in 1913, which Reuss proclaimed to be the church's official rite. This marked the first time an established church was to accept the Law of Thelema as its central doctrine. Reuss then announced a new title for himself: the "Sovereign Patriarch and Primate of the Gnostic Catholic Church".

In 1979, Hymenaeus Alpha X° (Grady McMurtry) separated Ecclesia Gnostica Catholica from Ordo Templi Orientis, and made it into an independent organization, with himself at the head of both. During this period of separation Ecclesia Gnostica Catholica published its own quarterly magazine. However, in 1986, his successor, Hymenaeus Beta, dissolved the separate Gnostic Catholic Church corporation and folded the church back into O.T.O. Since then the Church has expanded greatly, and in recent years several books and articles dealing with the E.G.C. and the Gnostic Mass have been published by its Clergy, notably by Tau Apiryon and Tau Helena, James and Nancy Wasserman, Rodney Orpheus, and Cathryn Orchard.

Gnostic Creed
The creed of Ecclesia Gnostica Catholica—also known as the Gnostic Creed—is recited in the Gnostic Mass, during the Ceremony of the Introit.

The text of the Creed is as follows:

Explication
The first six articles profess several beliefs by the congregants. The remaining two are confessions. The Creed ends with the Thelemic form of the Pranava, equivalent to the sacred Vedic syllable "Aum" or to the "Amen" of the Judaeo-Christian tradition. On the basic form of the Creed, Tau Apiryon and Helena (1998) write:

See also
Gnosticism
Magical organization

Notes

References
Crowley, Aleister. Liber XV, The Gnostic Mass.
Ordo Templi Orientis, U.S. Grand Lodge (2004). Ecclesia Gnostica Catholica. Retrieved January 3, 2005.
Helena and Tau Apiryon. (1998). The Creed of the Gnostic Catholic Church: an Examination. Retrieved Dec. 4, 2022.
Fr. HydraLVX. The Gnostic Catholic Creed: Seeds of Self Knowledge, appearing in Lion & Serpent: The Official Journal of Sekhet-Maat Lodge Volume 6, Number 2.
Thelemapedia (2005). Ecclesia Gnostica Catholica. Retrieved June 9, 2005.

External links

Gnosticism
Ordo Templi Orientis